Finders Keepers is a British children's game show television series that aired on BBC1 from 13 February 1981 to 1 March 1985, hosted by Richard Stilgoe.

Format
The show combined a quiz element with a computerised version of the game Battleships.  Two teams of three primary school-aged pupils would compete against each other. On scoring a "hit" at the Battleships game, the team had to answer a question to gain the associated points.

Theme
The show was also notable for host Richard Stilgoe playing the theme on a synthesiser live in the studio at the beginning, as well as the use of the phonetic alphabet to indicate the square on the battleship grid.

Transmissions

The series was a victim of the BBC's wiping of their children's programming in the 1990s. 28 out of 42 episodes survive in the BBC archives: Episodes 1 and 4 of Series 1, Episodes 1–2 and 4 of Series 2, Episodes 1 and 4–6 of Series 3, Episodes 1–6, 8 and 10–12 of Series 4 and all 9 episodes of Series 5.

References

External links

1981 British television series debuts
1985 British television series endings
1980s British children's television series
BBC children's television shows
British children's game shows
British children's television series
English-language television shows
Lost BBC episodes